Murang'a High School also known as' Muhae' is a Catholic church sponsored boys boarding high school located in Murang'a town, Kenya. It has over 1000 students. It was started in 1964 as a simple day school and has grown over the years. In 2014 it was elevated to a national school. The school is well known across the country for its high level of discipline among students, which is attributed to the school's motto: `Discipline Order Determination' or simply `DOD'.

Under the British Education System it has four classes, form 1, 2, 3 and 4. Form 1 and 2 each have seven streams namely, North, South, East, West, Central, B and M. The true meaning behind the abbreviation 'M' and 'B' are yet to be known. Form 4 has all the same classes as Form1 and 2 except from B.
School Website: https://murangahighschool.sc.ke/

 
Some of the school's notable alumni are: Robert Njiru (Bob)- Notable Renewable Energy Researcher and 2022 SOLAR Conference Lead, Hon. Kembi Gitura- 1st Senator Murang'a county, John Kiriamiti- Author, Dr. James Gicheru- of Mount Kenya University, Christopher Maina M.D- Cardiologist at Kenyatta National Hospital, among others.

References 

Education in Central Province (Kenya)
Catholic secondary schools in Kenya
Murang'a
Boarding schools in Kenya
Boys' schools in Kenya
Educational institutions established in 1964
1964 establishments in Kenya